Vrba is a settlement in the Municipality of Dobrna in Slovenia. The area is part of the traditional region of Styria. The municipality is now included in the Savinja Statistical Region.

The local church is dedicated to Saint Nicholas and belongs to the Parish of Dobrna. It dates to the late 14th century with 17th- and 18th-century adaptations.

References

External links
Vrba on Geopedia

Populated places in the Municipality of Dobrna